Andres Ciro Martínez (born 11 January 1968, in Buenos Aires) is an Argentine singer and musician. He was a member of the rock band Los Piojos, and now is the singer in a band called Ciro y los Persas since 2009.

Discography

Los Piojos
 Chactuchac (1993)
 Ay Ay Ay (1994)
 3er Arco (1996)
 Azul (1998)
 Ritual (1999)
 Verde Paisaje del Infierno (2000)
 Huracanes en Luna Plateada (2002)
 Máquina de Sangre (2003)
 Civilización (2007)

Ciro y los Persas
 Espejos (2010)
 27 (2012)
 Naranja Persa (2016/18)

External links
Ciro y Los Persas official site web
Los Piojos official site web

20th-century Argentine male singers
Argentine male singer-songwriters
Singers  from Buenos Aires
Rock en Español musicians
1968 births
Living people